Wishing Peace is the second recording released by the New York-based Toshiko Akiyoshi Jazz Orchestra featuring Lew Tabackin after 13 previous releases with their Los Angeles-based Toshiko Akiyoshi – Lew Tabackin Big Band.    "Lady Liberty", "Wishing Peace" and "Uptown Stroll" form the three part "Liberty Suite" written on the occasion of the 100th anniversary of the Statue of Liberty.

Track listing
All songs orchestrated by Toshiko Akiyoshi.  All songs composed by Akiyoshi except "Unrequited Love" (Tabackin):
LP side A
 "Feast in Milano" – 8:24
 "Unrequited Love" – 11:03
LP side B
"Liberty Suite"
 "Lady Liberty" – 8:02
 "Wishing Peace" – 8:14
 "Uptown Stroll" – 8:45

Personnel
Toshiko Akiyoshi – piano
Lew Tabackin – tenor saxophone, flute, piccolo
Walt Weiskopf – tenor saxophone, clarinet, flute
Frank Wess – alto saxophone, soprano saxophone, flute
Jim Snidero – alto saxophone, flute, clarinet
Mark Lopeman – baritone saxophone, bass clarinet
Joe Mosello – trumpet
John Eckert – trumpet
Brian Lynch – trumpet
Chris Pasin – trumpet
Hart Smith – trombone
Conrad Herwig – trombone
Kenny Rupp – trombone
Matt Finders – bass trombone
Jay Anderson – bass
Jeff Hirschfield – drums

Guest
Daniel Ponce – conga drums (track A1, "Feast in Milano")

Releases
Ken Music 27Ken-001
Ascent Records ASC 1006
Studio Songs YZSO-10030 (2013 re-issue)

References

Toshiko Akiyoshi – Lew Tabackin Big Band albums
1986 albums